Vadim Golubtsov (born 1988) is a retired professional ice hockey player who played the 2010–11 season in the Kontinental Hockey League with Metallurg Novokuznetsk.

References

Living people
Metallurg Novokuznetsk players
Russian ice hockey players
1988 births